The Symphony No. 1, Op. 22, is a symphony written by Malcolm Arnold in 1949. Arnold conducted the first performance at the Cheltenham Music Festival in 1951, with The Hallé Orchestra. A miniature score was published in 1952.

The work is in three movements:

I. Allegro (in D minor)
II. Andantino (in C major)
III. Vivace con fuoco

Commercial recordings
1980: Malcolm Arnold and the Bournemouth Symphony Orchestra on EMI Classics HMV ASD 3823 (LP) (latest re-release on EMI 382 1462)
1995: Richard Hickox and the London Symphony Orchestra on Chandos Records CHAN 9335 
1996: Vernon Handley and the Royal Philharmonic Orchestra on Conifer 75605-51257-2 (re-released on Decca 4765337) 
1996: Andrew Penny and the RTÉ National Symphony Orchestra on Naxos Records 8.553406 (recorded 10–11 April 1995, in the presence of the composer)

References

Symphony No. 1
1949 compositions